Arthur Leonard Schawlow (May 5, 1921 – April 28, 1999) was an American physicist and co-inventor of the laser with Charles Townes. His central insight, which Townes overlooked, was the use of two mirrors as the resonant cavity to take maser action from microwaves to visible wavelengths. He shared the 1981 Nobel Prize in Physics with Nicolaas Bloembergen and Kai Siegbahn for his work using lasers to determine atomic energy levels with great precision.

Biography
Schawlow was born in Mount Vernon, New York. His mother, Helen (Mason), was from Canada, and his father, Arthur Schawlow, was a Jewish immigrant from Riga (then in the Russian Empire, now in Latvia). Schawlow was raised in his mother's Protestant religion. When Arthur was three years old, they moved to Toronto, Ontario, Canada.

At the age of 16, he completed high school at Vaughan Road Academy (then Vaughan Collegiate Institute), and received a scholarship in science at the University of Toronto (Victoria College). After earning his undergraduate degree, Schawlow continued in graduate school at the University of Toronto which was interrupted due to World War II. At the end of the war, he began work on his Ph.D at the university with Professor Malcolm Crawford. He then took a postdoctoral position with Charles H. Townes at the physics department of Columbia University in the fall of 1949.

He went on to accept a position at Bell Labs in late 1951. He left in 1961 to join the faculty at Stanford University as a professor. He remained at Stanford until he retired to emeritus status in 1996.

Although his research focused on optics, in particular, lasers and their use in spectroscopy, he also pursued investigations in the areas of superconductivity and nuclear resonance. Schawlow shared the 1981 Nobel Prize in Physics with Nicolaas Bloembergen and Kai Siegbahn for their contributions to the development of laser spectroscopy.

Schawlow coauthored the widely used text Microwave Spectroscopy (1955) with Charles Townes. Schawlow and Townes were the first to publish the theory of laser design and operation in their seminal 1958 paper on "optical masers", although Gordon Gould is often credited with the "invention" of the laser, due to his unpublished work that predated Schawlow and Townes by a few months. The first working laser was made in 1960 by Theodore Maiman.

In 1991, the NEC Corporation and the American Physical Society established a prize: the Arthur L. Schawlow Prize in Laser Science. The prize is awarded annually to "candidates who have made outstanding contributions to basic research using lasers."

Science and religion
He participated in science and religion discussions. Regarding God, he stated, "I find a need for God in the universe and in my own life."

Personal life
In 1951, he married Aurelia Townes, younger sister of his postdoctoral advisor, Charles Townes. They had three children: Arthur Jr., Helen, and Edith. Arthur Jr. is autistic, with very little speech ability.

Schawlow and Professor Robert Hofstadter at Stanford, who also had an autistic child, teamed up to help each other find solutions to the condition. Arthur Jr. was put in a special center for autistic individuals, and later, Schawlow put together an institution to care for people with autism in Paradise, California. It was later named the Arthur Schawlow Center in 1999, shortly before his death. Schawlow was a promoter of the controversial method of facilitated communication with patients of autism.

He considered himself to be an orthodox Protestant Christian, and attended a Methodist church.
Arthur Schawlow was an intense fan and collector of traditional American jazz recordings, as well as a supporter of instrumental groups performing this type of music.

Schawlow died of leukemia in Palo Alto, California on April 28, 1999 at the age 77.

Awards and honors
1962 - Stuart Ballantine Medal
1963 - Young Medal and Prize, for distinguished research in the field of optics presented by the Institute of physics
1970 - elected to the American Academy of Arts and Sciences
1970 - elected to the National Academy of Sciences
1976 - awarded the Frederic Ives Medal by OSA
1981 - Nobel Prize for Physics
1983 - Golden Plate Award of the American Academy of Achievement
1984 - elected to the American Philosophical Society

Bibliography

See also

Optical Society of America#Past Presidents of the OSA

References

External links
  including the Nobel Lecture, December 8, 1981 Spectroscopy in a New Light
Nobel Winner: Arthur Leonard Schawlow
Bright Idea: The First Lasers (laser history) 
Press Release: The 1981 Nobel Prize in Physics
Arthur Leonard Schawlow obituary

1921 births
1999 deaths
People from Mount Vernon, New York
Nobel laureates in Physics
American Nobel laureates
American Methodists
American people of Canadian descent
20th-century American Jews
American people of Latvian-Jewish descent
20th-century American physicists
Autism activists
Columbia University faculty
Experimental physicists
Laser researchers
National Medal of Science laureates
Optical physicists
Fellows of the American Physical Society
Presidents of Optica (society)
Fellows of Optica (society)
Scientists at Bell Labs
Spectroscopists
University of Toronto alumni
Scientists from New York (state)
American expatriates in Canada
Members of the American Philosophical Society
Presidents of the American Physical Society